In mathematical logic, a theory  is complete if it is consistent and for every closed formula in the theory's language, either that formula or its negation is provable. That is, for every sentence  the theory  contains the sentence or its negation but not both (that is, either  or ). Recursively axiomatizable first-order theories that are consistent and rich enough to allow general mathematical reasoning to be formulated cannot be complete, as demonstrated by Gödel's first incompleteness theorem.

This sense of complete is distinct from the notion of a complete logic, which asserts that for every theory that can be formulated in the logic, all semantically valid statements are provable theorems (for an appropriate sense of "semantically valid"). Gödel's completeness theorem is about this latter kind of completeness.

Complete theories are closed under a number of conditions internally modelling the T-schema:

Maximal consistent sets are a fundamental tool in the model theory of classical logic and modal logic. Their existence in a given case is usually a straightforward consequence of Zorn's lemma, based on the idea that a contradiction involves use of only finitely many premises. In the case of modal logics, the collection of maximal consistent sets extending a theory T (closed under the necessitation rule) can be given the structure of a model of T, called the canonical model.

Examples

Some examples of complete theories are:
 Presburger arithmetic
 Tarski's axioms for Euclidean geometry
 The theory of dense linear orders without endpoints
 The theory of algebraically closed fields of a given characteristic
 The theory of real closed fields
 Every uncountably categorical countable theory
 Every countably categorical countable theory
 A group of three elements

See also

 Lindenbaum's lemma
 Łoś–Vaught test

References

 

Mathematical logic
Model theory